is a 2010 Japanese drama film directed by Kōji Wakamatsu, partially drawn from Edogawa Ranpo's banned short-story .

The film is a critique of the right-wing militarist nationalism that guided Japan's conduct in Asia during the Second Sino-Japanese War and World War II.  The film deals with various issues, such as war crimes, handicapped veterans, and spousal abuse. The film also deals with themes of sexual perversion and features graphic sex scenes.

It was nominated for the Golden Bear at the 60th Berlin International Film Festival. Shinobu Terajima received the Silver Bear for Best Actress at the Berlin Film Festival for her portrayal of Kurokawa's wife.

Plot
The film is set in the late 1930s, during the Second Sino-Japanese War. In the first scene, Lieutenant Kurokawa scourges, rapes and disembowels Chinese people during the war. Later, he returns home as a war hero, but with a horribly mutilated body. He is alive but reduced to a torso (no limbs), deaf and mute, with burns covering half of his face, but with three medals on his chest. Despite his condition, he is still constantly eager for sex, which he performs acrobatically with his wife. The sexual acts are rough and are imposed on his wife, who is repulsed by him. Nevertheless she feels a duty to take care of him. The film concludes with the disabled veteran Kurokawa committing suicide by dragging himself into a pond outside his home.

Cast
 Shinobu Terajima as Shigeko Kurokawa
 Keigo Kasuya as Tadashi Kurokawa
 Sabu Kawahara as The Village Chief
 Go Jibiki as Military officer #1
 Arata as Military officer #2
 Katsuyuki Shinohara as Kuma
 Daisuke Iijima as Commander
 Ichirō Ogura as Announcer
 Sanshirō Kobayashi as Village man #1
 Mariko Terada as Chinese woman #2
 Ken Furusawa

Themes
Wakamatsu's film is part of a revisionist movement seen in fashion, cartoons and videogames that reconsider the country's past. The film is the political response to and criticism of Yukio Mishima's  short film Patriotism. Caterpillar criticizes Japanese militarism, satirically deploys Japanese propaganda, and significantly politicizes and humanizes Edogawa Rampo's 1929 banned short-story. The film demystifies the glorification of war, which is used to hide war's grim reality. It also depicts the unfair demands placed on Japanese women, during war and peacetime.

The film represents a departure from Japanese depictions of World War 2 in the immediate Post-war years of Japanese film which often emphasized a notion of Japanese victimhood with little or no acknowledgement of wartime atrocities. There are frequent references in the film to the mass-rape and murder of Chinese civilians during the Second Sino-Japanese War. There is no sense that Japan was the primary victim of World War 2, as may be seen in other Japanese films on the war. The film is both anti-nationalist and anti-war in its approach to depiction of Imperial Japan in wartime.

Reception
The film received a 91% rating on film review aggregator Rotten Tomatoes. It grossed $4,157 at the domestic box office and $247,765 at the foreign box office for a combined Worldwide total of $251,922.

Awards
It was nominated for the Golden Bear at the 60th Berlin International Film Festival. Shinobu Terajima received the Silver Bear for Best Actress at the Berlin Film Festival for her portrayal of Kurokawa's wife.

References

External links
Official website: Japanese version, English version

2010 films
2010 drama films
2010 war drama films
2010s Japanese-language films
Japanese war drama films
Films about amputees
Films based on works by Edogawa Ranpo
Films directed by Kōji Wakamatsu
Films set in the 1930s
Second Sino-Japanese War films
Films based on short fiction
2010s Japanese films